Bahama Lobster Pirates is a reality series that follows six commercial lobster boats in the Bahamas, as they harvest lobster. The grand prize is $100 million.

The Crews
Atlantic Lady
New Wrinkle
Water Spout
Sea Gem
Summer Place
LD

Episodes

References

2010s American reality television series
2014 American television series debuts
2014 American television series endings
English-language television shows
Fishing television series
Lobster fishing